Floriculture, or flower farming, is a branch of horticulture concerned with the cultivation of flowering and ornamental plants for gardens and for floristry, comprising the floral industry. The development of new varieties by plant breeding is a major occupation of floriculturists.

Overview 
Floriculture crops include beddings plants, houseplants, flowering garden and pot plants, cut cultivated greens, and cut flowers. As distinguished from nursery crops, floriculture crops are generally herbaceous. Bedding and garden plants consist of young flowering plants (annuals and perennials) and vegetable plants. 

They are grown in cell packs (in flats or trays), in pots, or in hanging baskets, usually inside a controlled environment, and sold largely for gardens and landscaping. Pelargonium ("geraniums"), Impatiens ("busy lizzies"), and Petunia are the best-selling bedding plants. The many cultivars of Chrysanthemum are the major perennial garden plant in the United States.

Flowering plants are largely sold in pots for indoor use. The major flowering plants are poinsettias, orchids, florist chrysanthemums, and finished florist azaleas. Foliage plants are also sold in pots and hanging baskets for indoor and patio use, including larger specimens for office, hotel, and restaurant interiors.

Cut flowers are usually sold in bunches or as bouquets with cut foliage. The production of cut flowers is specifically known as the cut flower industry. Farming flowers and foliage employs special aspects of floriculture, such as spacing, training and pruning plants for optimal flower harvest; and post-harvest treatment such as chemical treatments, storage, preservation and packaging. In Australia and the United States some species are harvested from the wild for the cut flower market.

See also
Floriculture in Canada
Floriculture in Taiwan

References

 Floriculture researchers test pink poinsettias | CALS News Center Floriculture researchers test pink poinsettias | News from the College of Agriculture and Life Sciences
 Floriculture, Nursery - Rural Migration News | Migration Dialogue

Further reading
 USDA - National Agricultural Statistics Service Floriculture Crops 
 University of Florida
 California Cut Flower Commission
 University of Minnesota Florifacts
 North Carolina State University Floriculture Information Center
 https://www.researchgate.net/publication/295862115_Diversification_Through_Floriculture_in_Kashmir_Valley

External links

 
 

 
Floristry